Lublin Airport (Port Lotniczy Lublin)  is an airport in Poland serving Lublin and the surrounding region. The site is located about 10 km (6.2 miles) east of central Lublin, adjacent to the town of Świdnik. The airport has a 2520 × (45 + 2 × 7.5) m runway, and the terminal facilities are capable of handling four Boeing 737-800 class aircraft simultaneously. Construction began in the fall of 2010 and the official opening took place on December 17, 2012. The new airport replaced the grass airstrip, which had served the PZL-Świdnik helicopter factory, and was known as Świdnik Airport with the ICAO identifier EPSW.

History

Early years
The construction of the Świdnik airfield began in 1935 and it was officially opened on 4 June 1939. It was to serve as a training centre with a pilot school, and was built by the Airborne and Antigas Defence League, a mass organisation propagating aviation among the general public. During World War II, it was used by the Luftwaffe after Poland was occupied in September 1939, and then by the Soviet Air Force once Lublin was captured by the Red Army in July 1944. The Germans destroyed the airfield's buildings before withdrawing.

After World War II
The airport opened for passenger traffic on 30 November 1945. A domestic service was opened with flight number 1/2 that flew the route Warsaw – Łódź – Kraków – Rzeszów – Lublin – Warsaw. Unfortunately, there is very little written material from the time that mentions this route, so proper sources are required. . The route was later discontinued and Lublin lost all domestic services. 
In 1949, the Polish government made a decision to build an aviation factory in Świdnik, located next to the airfield. It assembled its first helicopters in 1956, with full-scale production beginning in 1957.

The factory employed some staff from the pre-war Lubelska Wytwórnia Samolotów, an airplane manufacturer in Lublin that functioned from 1936 to 1939, being itself the successor of Plage i Laśkiewicz factory which functioned between 1920 and 1935. That factory had its own airfield within the Lublin city limits, but it was closed and built over after the war. One of the streets running through the area where the airfield used to be is named Lotnicza (Aviation Street).

Current facilities
The need for an air terminus in Lublin, the 9th biggest city in Poland, has been felt for the better half of 20th century. In 2008, the project received €84.1 million financing backing from the European Union. Subsequently, the airport design competition was won by a Polish-Spanish consortium of SENER Ingeniería y Sistemas (engineering & master plan) and Warsaw-based architectural firm ARÉ (architecture). The architectural design was well received by the design community; however the fit and finish of the completed terminal building fell short of the winning proposal. The contract to build the runway was signed in August, 2011, with completion in late 2012. Operations commenced on December 17, 2012, with a Category I instrument landing system, which was later upgraded to a Category II system for low visibility operations.

A Reuters special report in December 2014 highlighted Lublin Airport (along with Łódź and Rzeszów airports) as a target of inefficient EU subsidies with disappointing passenger numbers.

In July 2016, Lufthansa announced the termination of its route from Frankfurt Airport to Lublin due to low demand by 29 October 2016 after only two years of service.

In September 2015 WizzAir opened its base at Lublin Airport with one Airbus A320 Aircraft. In November 2017, the company announced that they will close its base in Lublin that resulted in terminating services to Doncaster Sheffield, Liverpool and Tel-Aviv in June 2018, decreasing frequency on the route to Oslo and further termination of service to Kiev Zhulyany and Stockholm Skvasta in late October 2018.

In October 2018, EasyJet ended its only route from Lublin, a service to Milan Malpensa.

In January 2021, the airport opened a small cargo facility.

Airlines and destinations
The following airlines operate regular scheduled and charter flights at Lublin Airport:

Passenger statistics

Ground transportation

Train

Lublin Airport was accessible by rail, a railway station inside the airport terminal built at the end of a dedicated 3.7 kilometre line. The connection to Lublin's main railway station was provided by EMU (Electric Multiple Unit), EN57AL series 3000. The journey took approximately 15 minutes from Lublin Central Station. With patronage having fallen to below 50 passengers a day, it was replaced by a bus service in November 2021.

Bus
There is a dedicated bus service to the airport, with a flexible schedule, which starts its run to the airport 2 hours before each flight departure, and leaves the airport 25 minutes after flight arrival.

Car
The airport is located close to Expressways S17 and S12.

See also
List of airports in Poland

References

External links

Official website of Lublin Airport 
Official website of Lublin Airport 

Airports in Poland
Buildings and structures in Lublin
Airports established in 2012